Michael Hookem (born  9 October 1953) is a British politician who served as Member of the European Parliament (MEP) for Yorkshire and the Humber from 2014 to 2019.

A former member of the UK Independence Party (UKIP), Hookem served as UKIP's Deputy Leader under Gerard Batten from February 2018 until his resignation in May 2019 to run for the leadership. He also served as Spokesperson for Fisheries and Veterans Affairs from 2016 to 2019, and as Spokesperson for Defence in 2019 and previously from 2014 to 2016.

Early life
Hookem grew up in the fishing community in the east of Kingston upon Hull, and left school at 15. His father worked on the docks. Hookem enlisted in the Royal Air Force at the age of 17, and served for four years.

After working in various trades he rejoined the military, serving in the Royal Engineers as a TA Commando Engineer for nine years.

UKIP politics
Hookem voted for the Labour Party until he became disillusioned with what he considered "a criminal Labour government". In response to his disillusionment with Labour, Hookem joined UKIP in 2008, after having for years been a Labour member.

He stood as UKIP candidate in Kingston upon Hull East in the 2010 general election, and finished fourth with 2,745 votes (8%).

Hookem was elected in 2014 to the European Parliament. He had served as UKIP's regional chairman for Yorkshire and North Lincolnshire until that election. He was replaced as chairman by Judith Morris from July 2014.

On 6 October 2016, Hookem was involved in a fight with fellow UKIP MEP Steven Woolfe during a UKIP meeting at the European Parliament in Strasbourg. Hookem said he had not punched Woolfe, but did admit to a "scuffle" with him and that he acted in self-defence.  The altercation was an outgrowth of a party meeting to discuss news reports that Woolfe was in talks about defecting to the Conservative Party.  Hookem said Woolfe "took exception" to his comment about Woolfe turning his leadership application paperwork late.  Hookem was asked if he would accept a suspension and Hookem said: "If they suspend me, yes. By our rules if they suspend me they have to suspend Steven Woolfe".

Hookem stood as UKIP's candidate for Great Grimsby in the 2017 general election, finishing third with 1,647 votes (4.6%), thus losing his deposit.

Following the election of Henry Bolton as leader of UKIP, Hookem was appointed assistant deputy leader as well as UKIP spokesman on fisheries and on veterans affairs. He stood down as the party's assistant deputy leader on 22 January 2018 after Bolton refused to resign as leader following a vote of no confidence in him from UKIP's National Executive Committee the previous day.

From February 2018 to May 2019, Hookem served as UKIP's Deputy Leader; Hookem resigned in May 2019 to challenge Gerard Batten's leadership of the party. He sat as a non-attached (Non-Inscrit) Member of the European Parliament following the party's split from the EFDD Group led by UKIP's former leader, Nigel Farage, while Batten and Stuart Agnew joined the Europe of Nations and Freedom group.

After leaving UKIP, Hookem helped to found the Alliance for Democracy and Freedom Party (ADF), becoming the party’s Chairman.

Elections contested
UK Parliament

European Parliament elections

References

External links
 

1953 births
Living people
MEPs for England 2014–2019
People from Kingston upon Hull
Politicians from Kingston upon Hull
UK Independence Party MEPs
UK Independence Party parliamentary candidates
Royal Air Force airmen
Royal Engineers soldiers
British Army Commandos soldiers
Labour Party (UK) politicians
Military personnel from Kingston upon Hull
British Eurosceptics